Regius Professor of Law may refer to:

 Regius Professor of Law (Glasgow)
 Regius Professor of Laws (Dublin)

See also 

 Regius Professor of Civil Law (disambiguation)